The State Grid Corporation of China (SGCC), commonly known as the State Grid, is a Chinese state-owned electric utility corporation. It is the largest utility company in the world, and as of 2022, the world's third largest company overall by revenue, behind Walmart and Amazon. In 2022 it was reported as having 871,145 employees, 1.1 billion customers and revenue equivalent to US$460 billion. It is overseen by the State-owned Assets Supervision and Administration Commission of the State Council.

After the electricity Plant-Grid Separation reform in early 2002, the assets of State Electric Power Corporation were divided into five power generation groups that retained the power plants and five regional subsidiaries belonging to the State Grid Corporation of China in Beijing.

History
China began an initiative to reform the country's power sector in a three-stage process in 1986. In the third and final stage in March 2002 the State Council of the People's Republic of China put into effect a plan to restructure the country's electric power system in order to create competition and separate generation and transmission functions. The State Grid Corporation of China was founded on December 29, 2002, when the restructuring divided the former State Power Corporation of China into two grid companies, five generation groups and four accessorial business companies. The two grid companies created were the State Grid Corporation of China and a smaller China Southern Power Grid Company. At its creation, the company had a generation capacity of 6.47 gigawatts.

In 2003 and progressively so through the early 2000s, electrical shortages caused the government to institute rolling blackouts. The State Grid Corporation estimated there were 1 trillion yuan in losses from 2002 to 2005. The State Grid Corporation of China ran the first 1,000-kilovolt alternating current power line between Northern Shanxi and center Hubei in January 2009. In 2012 it began operation of an 800-kilovolt direct current line that sends hydropower from western Sichuan to Shanghai. It also has an alternating current loop line in the Yangtze River delta, and three longitudinal alternating current lines that bring power to Southern China from the Northern region.

The State Grid Corporation was involved in a multi-phase smart-grid project for China's electrical grid planned for 2011–2015. China's smart grid efforts are different from those in the United States in that its plans heavily use ultra high voltage (UHV) lines. Several UHV construction projects began in 2012 to bring UHV power lines across Huainan, Wannan, and Shanghai and another from Xilingol League to Nanjing. By 2015, the company planned to have three more horizontal UHV lines through West Inner Mongolia to Weifang, from Central Shanxi–Xuzhou to Yaan–southern Anhui and 11 other lines by 2015.

In 2012 the company invested in CDP Reti.

From 2010 to 2020 the companies investments in grid expansion rose from 291.12 BioYuan to 460.5 BioYuan.

Controversy
On October 29, 2014, The Central Commission for Discipline Inspection declared that the general manager of State Grid Shanghai Municipal Electric Power, Feng Jun, was detained in an anti-graft operation overseen by the commission. In 2017, his assets (worth 53 million yuan) were seized, and he was sentenced to life in prison.

Overseas investments

Philippines
On December 12, 2007, two consortia bid for a 25-year license to run the Philippines power grid—privatization of the management of the Philippine government-owned National Transmission Corporation (TransCo), the consortium of Monte Oro Grid Resources Corp., led by businessman Enrique Razon, comprising the State Grid Corporation of China, and Calaca High Power Corp., won an auction conducted by the Power Sector Assets and Liabilities Management (PSALM) Corp. as it submitted the highest offer of $3.95 billion, for the right to operate TransCo for 25 years, outbidding San Miguel Energy, a unit of the Filipino San Miguel Corporation (bid of $3.905 billion), Dutch firm TPG Aurora BV, and Malaysia's TNB Prai Sdn Bhd. This started the transition period for the turnover of operations and maintenance of the Philippine power grid from TransCo to the resulting consortium (National Grid Corporation of the Philippines (NGCP)).

On February 28, 2008, TransCo's concession agreement with NGCP was executed and became effective. The agreement between NGCP and TransCo was signed by TransCo president Arthur Aguilar, PSALM president Jose Ibazeta, and NGCP directors Walter Brown, Elmer Pedregosa and Du Zhigang. In November of that same year, Congress approved bicameral resolution granting franchise to NGCP to manage and operate its transmission facilities nationwide. President Gloria Macapagal Arroyo signed Republic Act 9511 which granted NGCP to operate and manage the country's power grid in December 2008.

On January 15, 2009, TransCo turned over the operations, maintenance, and management of the transmission system to NGCP which marked the start of the 25-year concession period and franchise and renewable for another 25 years with a total of 50 years, and ended the transition period for the privatization of the operations and maintenance of the power grid. The franchise and concession period will end on December 1, 2058.

Other countries
In Portugal, State Grid has a 25% stake in REN since the second stage of its privatization (in 2012–2014).

In Australia, State Grid owns a 41% stake in ElectraNet, a 19.9% stake in AusNet Services, and 60% stake in Jemena.

In Brazil, State Grid acquired the control of CPFL Energia S.A. for the equivalent of US$3.4 billion in 2017. State Grid built the 2000 km Ultra High Voltage power line delivering hydropower to the megacities Rio de Janeiro and Sao Paolo.

In Chile, State Grid acquired Chilquinta Energía, the third-largest distributor of electricity in Chile, and Tecnored SA, which provides construction services to Chilquinta, from U.S. power company Sempra Energy. The deal was closed on June 24, 2020. On 13 November 2020, it was announced that State Grid had reached an agreement to acquire Compañia General de Electricidad (CGE), the largest distribution of electricity in this country.

Subsidiaries
 State Grid Yingda Group
 Yingda International Trust (89.76%)

See also

 China Southern Power Grid
 China Datang Corporation
 List of companies of China
 Smart grid

References

External links

 
Xicheng District
Energy companies established in 2002
Government-owned companies of China
Electric power transmission system operators in China
Chinese brands
Chinese companies established in 2002
Companies based in Beijing